Club de Fútbol Real Cuautitlán was a Mexican football club that played in the Segunda División Profesional. The club was based in Cuautitlán, State of Mexico.

History
The club was founded in 1996 joining the Tercera División de México that same year the club managed  to win the tournament and earned the promotion to the Segunda División Profesional and would join forces with Necaxa.

In 1999 the club won the Invierno 1999 Championship defeating in the final Club Atlético Tapatío F.C. The club went on to play the promotion match against Club Deportivo Marte who had won the Verano 2000, which they lost.

The club played in the Segunda División Profesional under the name Cocoleros de Cuautitlán.

Past crests

See also
Football in Mexico

Players

Current squad

Most Recent Players
 Luis Ernesto Pérez 
 Mario Pérez.
 Diego Alfonso Martínez.
 José Ramiréz
 Alfredo "Chango" Moreno.
 Carlos Flores.
 Armando "Loco" Ávila Dorador.
 Gabriel Roussique.
 Jose Trinidad Saenz L.
 Carlos Vazquez.
 Christian Martinez.
 Angel Raúl "Rambo" Sosa Hernández.
 Geovanni Torres.
 J. Eduardo "Toro" Ávila V.
 Gabriel Casas.
 Pablo Ornelas.
 Brandon Buitron.
 Alexandro "Monstruo" Álvarez 
 Alfonso Blanco.
 Antonio Moreno.
 Francisco Pastor G Montero.

Honors
Tercera División de México(2): 1995-96 y 2012-13
Segunda División Profesional(1):Invierno 1999
Segunda División Profesional Promotion (2)
"Primera División A" Promotion (1)
Runner Up(1): Apertura 2003

References

Football clubs in the State of Mexico
Association football clubs established in 1996
1996 establishments in Mexico